The 2006 World Team Judo Championships were held at the Bercy in Paris, France from 16 to 17 September 2006.

Medal summary

References

External links
 

 
World Team Judo Championships
World Team Judo Championships
WC 2006
World Team Judo Championships